Daeqwon R. Plowden (born August 29, 1998) is an American professional basketball player for the Birmingham Squadron of the NBA G League. He played college basketball for the Bowling Green Falcons.

High school career
Plowden is a native of Germantown, Philadelphia, and attended Mastery Charter North School. He was the school's first 1,000-point scorer and was a two-time all-state team selection. Plowden played primarily as a forward and center in high school; he credits his team's coaches, Terrence Cook and Gerald Johnson, for teaching him combined big man and guard skills.

On November 9, 2016, Plowden signed his National Letter of Intent to play for the Bowling Green Falcons. ESPN ranked him as the 20th best player in Pennsylvania in his recruiting class.

College basketball
Plowden was named to the All-Mid-American Conference (MAC) second-team in 2020 and the third-team in 2021 and 2022. He was selected to the MAC All-Defensive team in 2022.

Plowden finished his career with the Falcons with 1,618 points and 935 rebounds. He did not miss a game during his college career and is the program leader in games played with 154.

Professional career

Birmingham Squadron (2022–present)
Plowden worked out with the Washington Wizards, New Orleans Pelicans and Utah Jazz prior to the 2022 NBA draft but went undrafted. He joined the Pelicans for the 2022 NBA Summer League and averaged 12 points per game. On September 9, 2022, Plowden signed with the Pelicans. On October 15, he was waived by the Pelicans. On November 4, 2022, Plowden was named to the opening night roster for the Birmingham Squadron.

References

External links
Bowling Green Falcons bio
College statistics

1998 births
Living people
American men's basketball players
Basketball players from Philadelphia
Bowling Green Falcons men's basketball players
Shooting guards
Small forwards